Brämhults IK is a Swedish football club located in Brämhult.

Background
Brämhults IK currently plays in Division 4 Västergötland Södra which is the sixth tier of Swedish football. They play their home matches at the Brämhults IP in Brämhult.

The club is affiliated to Västergötlands Fotbollförbund.

Season to season

Footnotes

External links
 Brämhults IK – Official website
 Brämhults IK on Facebook

Football clubs in Västra Götaland County
1953 establishments in Sweden